Francis X. Clines (February 7, 1938 - 2022) was an American journalist and author. He worked for The New York Times for his entire career, from 1958 to 2017.

Books
About New York: Sketches of the City (McGraw-Hill, 1979)

References

External links
Francis X. Clines - The New York Times

American journalists
The New York Times people
American writers
1938 births
2022 deaths